Nasser Karam (born 1 June 1957) is an Egyptian sailor. He competed in the Finn event at the 1984 Summer Olympics.

References

External links
 

1957 births
Living people
Egyptian male sailors (sport)
Olympic sailors of Egypt
Sailors at the 1984 Summer Olympics – Finn
Place of birth missing (living people)